The Fukuromachi Elementary School Peace Museum (袋町小学校平和資料館 Fukuromachi Shogakkou Heiwa Shiryokan) is a peace museum in Fukuromachi, Naka-ku, Hiroshima, Japan. The school was one of the closest schools to ground zero when the atomic bomb fell on August 6, 1945. They lost about 160 students and teachers and the building was heavily damaged. After a few days, the school became a first aid station, and its black burned wall became a message board to find missing people. The Peace Museum is the section of the school building with the basement of the former Municipal Fukuromachi Elementary School in Hiroshima. The school is keeping it as a relic of the atomic explosion, to foster peace, and to send their information to the world.

History
Opened as a school in the Kaizen-ji, a temple of Pure Land Buddhism, on February 2, 1873.
Moved to Fukuromachi, the current place and was renamed "Sakuragawa School" in September, 1876.
Renamed "Onchi Elementary School" in October, 1884.
Renamed "Fukuromachi Jinjyo Elementary School" in August, 1890.
Moved to Harimayamachi and renamed "Harimayamachi Jinjyo Elementary School" in March, 1893.
Moved back to Fukuromachi in May 1910.
Renamed "Fukuromachi Jinjyo Elementary School" in April, 1911.
The main lecture hall was built in February 1927.
The reinforced concrete school building was built in January, 1937.
About 160 students and teachers were killed by the atomic bomb on August 6, 1945.
School reopened for 37 students in May, 1946.
Renamed "Municipal Fukuromachi Elementary School in Hiroshima", current name, in April 1947.
New building and lecture hall was built in November 1952.
Another new building was built in June 1957.
Moved to temporary schoolhouse in December 1999.
New school buildings were built in April 2002.
Part of the building, built in 1937, was opened as the Peace Museum in April 2002.

Museum

Exhibitions
Photographs
Damaged objects

Education programs
NHK TV documentary program will be shown
Please Tell Me - Hiroshima, The Recalling Messages of the Atomic Bomb -
NHK Special : "Please Yuko, Tell me where you are, from your mom" 
NHK Special : "The Day of the Atomic Bomb"

See also
Municipal Fukuromachi Elementary School in Hiroshima
Atomic bombings of Hiroshima and Nagasaki
Honkawa Elementary School Peace Museum

External links
Fukuromachi Elementary School Peace Museum
Municipal Fukuromachi Elementary School in Hiroshima
Fukuromachi Kokumn School

Peace museums
1873 establishments in Japan
School buildings completed in 1937
Museums established in 2002
Museums in Hiroshima
Monuments and memorials in Japan
Monuments and memorials concerning the atomic bombings of Hiroshima and Nagasaki
History museums in Japan
World War II museums in Japan
Educational institutions established in 1873
2002 establishments in Japan